The Pembina Curling Club  located in Winnipeg, Manitoba, is a six-sheet curling club located in the south part of the city. The club was established in 1947 by a group of Fort Garry residents in Winnipeg and led by Art Elders. The cinder block building was finished in 1952 despite curling taking place over the last five years. The current six-sheet facility was completed in 1965 and setback from the previous location beside the highway. Mike Riley curled out of the club when he won the 1984 Labatt Brier.

References

External links

 Manitoba Historical Society
 Club website

Curling clubs established in 1947
Sports venues in Winnipeg
Curling clubs in Canada
1947 establishments in Manitoba
Curling in Winnipeg
Municipal Historical Resources of Winnipeg